Doug and the Slugs and Me is a Canadian documentary film, directed by Teresa Alfeld and released in 2022. The film documents the history of the 1980s Canadian rock band Doug and the Slugs, jumping off from Alfeld's own childhood friendship with bandleader Doug Bennett's daughter Shea.

In addition to the surviving band members, other figures interviewed in the film about their memories of the band include Bob Geldof, Bif Naked, Steven Page, Darby Mills, Ron Sexsmith, Terry David Mulligan and Ed the Sock. Due to Doug Bennett's death in 2004, his own perspective on the band is depicted through narration of selected excerpts from his personal journals.

The film debuted on May 14, 2022, at the DOXA Documentary Film Festival. Later screenings included the 2022 Cinéfest Sudbury International Film Festival, and the 2022 Edmonton International Film Festival. It was broadcast by CBC Television on January 15, 2023.

References

External links 
 

2022 films
2022 documentary films
Canadian documentary films
Documentary films about musical groups
English-language Canadian films
2020s Canadian films